Long Island Power Authority (LIPA, "lie-pah") is a municipal subdivision of the State of New York that owns the electric transmission and electric distribution system serving all of Long Island and a portion of New York City known as the Rockaways.  LIPA was originally created under the Long Island Power Act of 1985 to acquire the Long Island Lighting Company (LILCO)'s electric and natural gas infrastructure after the cancellation of the Shoreham Nuclear Power Plant. LIPA acquired LILCO's transmission system in May 1998, while the remainder of LILCO's natural gas-related infrastructure merged with Brooklyn Union Gas to form KeySpan Energy.

Before 2014, LIPA's electric and natural gas infrastructure was run under its own name, though KeySpan operated its electric and natural gas infrastructure under a prior management contract with LIPA until 2007. KeySpan merged with National Grid USA in 2007, and National Grid began operating the electric infrastructure portion of LIPA business until 2013.

Since January 1, 2014, LIPA has contracted with New Jersey-based Public Service Enterprise Group to operate LIPA's electric infrastructure on LIPA's behalf for a period of 12 years. National Grid handed control of the electric infrastructure portion of LIPA business to PSEG at the close of business on December 31, 2013. KeySpan still operates the natural gas infrastructure on Long Island.

LIPA's Long Island electric system provides service to over 1.1 million customers in Nassau and Suffolk counties and the Rockaway Peninsula in Queens. LIPA does not own or operate any generation plants or retail natural gas assets on Long Island, although many generation plants are under contract to LIPA to meet its power supply needs. LIPA is listed as the "Owner, Operator and/or Billing Organization" for 27 electric power generation facilities located on Long Island in the 2018 NYISO Gold Book, for a total of about 5,048 megawatts (MW) of nameplate capacity.

Organization
LIPA's policy is guided by a 9-member board of trustees. The LIPA management team is headed by Tom Falcone who was appointed CEO in March 2016. Ralph V. Suozzi is the chairman of LIPA's Board of Trustees, appointed by Governor Andrew Cuomo. In 2017, LIPA had operating expenses of $3.214 billion, an outstanding debt of $3.574 billion, and a level of staffing of 54 people. Although Public Service Law Section 3-b grants the New York State Public Service Commission the ability to review and make recommendations in regards to LIPA's electric retail rates and spending, the NYSPSC does not have the power to set those rates or expenditure levels. It can, however, inspect LIPA's facilities, books, and records. The New York State Public Service Commission runs its own field office on Long Island to enforce this recommendation and inspection capability.

On January 24, 2007, then-governor Eliot Spitzer announced that Kevin Law would replace Richard Kessel as chairman of LIPA until the fall, when a new chairman would be named and Law would become chief executive officer of LIPA. On October 8, 2007, Law took over as president and CEO.  Kevin Law stepped down on September 1, 2010 in order to become the president of the Long Island Association.

Facilities
LIPA owns electric transmission and distribution lines with the following voltages: 
 Transmission: 345-kilovolts (kV) and 138-kV
 Distribution: 69-kV, 33-kV, 23-kV, 13.2-kV and 4.16-kV

Power vendors 
LIPA does not own or operate any generation plants or retail natural gas assets on Long Island, although many generation plants are under contract to LIPA to meet its power supply needs.  The following table lists generating resources in NYISO Region K, corresponding to Long Island, with nonzero net energy generated in 2020:

For comparison, Long Island had a peak electric demand of 4,972 MW and New York State had a peak demand of 29,699 MW in 2017.

Most of Long Island's largest power plants are operated by National Grid, which owns three major steam turbine facilities originally constructed by the Long Island Lighting Company (LILCO) in the mid-20th century.  In 1998, as part of a state-brokered deal, LILCO's power generation facilities were absorbed into KeySpan Energy, with LIPA taking over transmission and delivery functions.  KeySpan was acquired by National Grid in 2007.

Most of the other larger or highly utilized plants are combined cycle power plants constructed by other entities between 1989 and 2009.  As of 2021, the South Fork Wind Farm project is under construction, and the Empire Wind and Sunrise Wind projects are in planning, all of which are planned to connet to the Long Island power grid.

In addition to locally generated power, LIPA as of 2021 receives about 40% of its power from outside Long Island via the Cross Sound Cable, Neptune Cable, Y-49 Cable, Y-50 Cable, and Northport–Norwalk Harbor Cable.

Utility Debt Securitization Authority
The Utility Debt Securitization Authority is a separate New York State public-benefit corporation run by a governor-appointed board of trustees that is responsible for LIPA's financial reporting. In 2017, it had operating expenses of $122.2 million, an outstanding debt of $4.262 billion, and a level of staffing of 3 people.

Controversy

Hurricane Sandy
On December 15, 2011, LIPA selected Public Service Enterprise Group of New Jersey, the largest electric utility of that state, to take over management and operation of the electric grid from National Grid, starting in January 2014.

In 2012 and 2013, LIPA and National Grid caught much media criticism in their response to Hurricane Sandy.  As a result, key people at LIPA resigned including Michael Hervey, COO of LIPA, who resigned on November 13, 2012  and, though not officially confirmed as a response to Sandy, Bruce Germano (VP of Customer Service) and X. Cristofer Damianos (member of the board of trustees) who resigned on November 27, 2012, and LIPA chairman Howard Steinberg who resigned on November 30, 2012.

On January 9, 2013, Governor Cuomo called for the transfer of operations of LIPA in his State of the State speech. Even though the governor appoints five of the nine trustees to serve on the LIPA Board, he cited LIPA's inability to quickly recover from Hurricane Sandy among other incidents. In May, he announced a plan to give PSEG day-to-day operations of LIPA's electric grid under a management contract. The Long Island Power Authority is the owner of the system and holder of its debt. On July 29, 2013  the state legislature passed a law implementing Governor Cuomo's plan.  On January 1, 2014 PSEG rebranded the LIPA system "PSEG Long Island", effectively removing the LIPA name from the public eye.

2013 LIPA Reform Act
The 2013 LIPA Reform Act has been criticized by the New York State Comptroller for having contributed to a more expensive and less transparent retail electric service provider in LIPA. The comptroller noted that LIPA's debts have risen since its passage and in the case of transparency, noted that PSEG-LI requested three-quarters of rate case plan documents to be kept confidential, even with the New York State Public Service Commission's enhanced review power. The report from the comptroller's office also noted that the new New York State Public Service Commission's Long Island office is costing Long Island rate payers $8 million a year. A bill was introduced in 2016 that would enhance rate setting abilities by the New York State Public Service Commission. It would have also lifted a provision from state law that disallows LIPA from buying cheap hydroelectric energy directly from the New York Power Authority - see the Green Island Power Authority for comparison. A news article stated that the Governor's office was reviewing the bill.

See also
 Green Island Power Authority
 Indian Point Energy Center
 Long Island Lighting Company
 Nassau Interim Finance Authority
 Nassau Health Care Corporation
 New York energy law
 New York Power Authority
 New York State Energy Research and Development Authority
 New York State Public Service Commission
 Northport Power Station

References

Companies based in Nassau County, New York
Municipal electric utilities of the United States
Public benefit corporations in New York (state)
Rockaway, Queens
Suffolk County, New York
Public Service Enterprise Group
Energy infrastructure on Long Island, New York